The San Mateo County Libraries (SMCL), formerly San Mateo County Library, is a public library system and Joint Powers Authority headquartered in San Mateo, California. Its motto is "Open for Exploration".

It is a member of the Peninsula Library System. It serves the smaller cities of San Mateo County who do not have a city library.

Locations
The following locations are a part of the system:

The bookmobile service travels around the county to various locations like schools, post offices, and even the Hiller Aviation Museum.

References

External links

Libraries in San Mateo County, California
County library systems in California